The 1980 U.S. Clay Court Championships was a men's Grand Prix and women's Colgate Series tennis tournament held at the Indianapolis Sports Center in Indianapolis in the United States and played on outdoor clay courts. It was the 12th edition of the tournament and was held from August 4 through August 10, 1980. Eighth-seeded José Luis Clerc and top-seeded Chris Evert-Lloyd won the singles titles.

Finals

Men's singles

 José Luis Clerc defeated  Mel Purcell 7–5, 6–3
 It was Clerc's 3rd singles title of the year and the 7th of his career.

Women's singles

 Chris Evert-Lloyd defeated  Andrea Jaeger 6–4, 6–3
 It was Evert-Lloyd's 4th singles title of the year and the 97th of her career.

Men's doubles

 Kevin Curren /  Steve Denton defeated  Wojciech Fibak /  Ivan Lendl 3–6, 7–6, 6–4
 It was Curren's 2nd title of the year and of his career. It was also Denton's 2nd title of the year and of his career.

Women's doubles

 Anne Smith /  Paula Smith defeated  Virginia Ruzici /  Renáta Tomanová 4–6, 6–3, 6–4
 It was Anne Smith's 6th title of the year and the 12th of her career. It was Paula Smith's 1st title of the year and of her career.

References

External links 

 
U.S. Clay Court Championships
U.S. Clay Court Championships
U.S. Clay Court Championships
U.S. Clay Court Championships
U.S. Clay Court Championships